Ilvar-e Yek Dangeh (also Romanized as Īlvār-e Yek Dāngeh) is a village in Sadan Rostaq-e Gharbi Rural District, in the Central District of Kordkuy County, Golestan Province, Iran. At the 2006 census, its population was 1,124, in 315 families.

References 

Populated places in Kordkuy County